Catholic Faith Network (CFN), formerly Telecare, is an American television channel available to Altice USA, Verizon Fios, and Charter Communications subscribers in New York, New Jersey, and Connecticut.  Founded in 1969 by Monsignor Thomas Hartman of the Roman Catholic Diocese of Rockville Centre in New York. CFN broadcasts programming aimed at to Catholic viewers, including live religious services, talk shows, devotional programs, educational programming, entertainment, and children's programs. It also presents coverage of special events at the Vatican and of papal journeys. The Catholic Faith Network (CFN) is available on Optimum channel 29/137, Verizon Fios TV channel 296, and Charter Spectrum channel 162/471 throughout the New York, New Jersey, and Connecticut area. The Catholic Faith Network (CFN) is also available on select cable and satellite systems nationwide, along with an on-demand library of original programming and a 24/7 live stream.

Telecare was rebranded as Catholic Faith Network on September 7, 2018.

Leadership
Msgr. James C. Vlaun is currently President and CEO of Catholic Faith Network (CFN).

Program titles
A partial listing of CFN's programs:
 Daily Mass from St. Agnes Cathedral (Rockville Centre, New York) (Long Island, New York) (in English and Spanish)
 Daily Mass from St. Patrick's Cathedral (New York City)
 Daily Mass Celebrated by Pope Francis from the Santa Marta Chapel in Rome​ (on demand)
 Catholic Perspectives with Bishop William Murphy
 Celebrating the Saints
 CFN Live
 CFN News
 CFN Special Presentation
 Chaplet of Divine Mercy
 Catholic Health: Dr. O: Faithfully Transforming Health Care
 Catholic Health: Lifestyles at the Heart of Health
 Conversation with Cardinal Dolan
 Encounter - with Bishop John Barres
 Family Comes First - Hosted by Vincent J. Russo and Victoria Roberts Drogin. Real families facing real issues with grace, hope, and determination
 In His Image
 Living Word
 Live from the Sheen Center
 Molloy: Public Square 2.0
 Papal Audience from Rome
 Real Food, hosted by Monsignor Jim Vlaun, highlights the importance of faith, gathering with family, and the spiritual nature of sharing a meal, bringing faith into the kitchen
 Seven Last Words of Christ
 Stations of the Cross
 St. Joseph's College: Living Our Mission
 St. Joseph's Seminary
 Tomorrow's Hope
 Walking with Mary
 The Word
 The Rosary (in English and Spanish)

Religion and Rock
Religion and Rock is a weekly 60-minute classic rock radio program with Monsignor Jim Vlaun, broadcast locally on Sunday morning, and on Sirius/XM on Saturday and Sunday evenings. The podcasts are available free on the website and on iTunes. (Not to be confused with Rock & Religion Radio Show.)

Studios
The Catholic Faith Network's studio facilities are located in Uniondale, New York on the campus of Kellenberg Memorial High School and in Manhattan.

See also
 Catholic television
 Catholic television channels
 Catholic television networks
 The God Squad (Telecare), former program
 CatholicTV, Massachusetts
 Padre Pio TV, Italy

References

Catholic television channels
Catholic television networks
Religious television stations in the United States
Roman Catholic Diocese of Rockville Centre
Television networks in the United States
Television stations in New York (state)
Television channels and stations established in 1969